The 1948 Montana State Bobcats football team was an American football team that represented Montana State University in the Rocky Mountain Conference (RMC) during the 1948 college football season. In its third season under head coach Clyde Carpenter, the team compiled a 2–7 record.

Schedule

References

Montana State
Montana State Bobcats football seasons
Montana State Bobcats football